John Doyle (born March 31, 1942) is an American politician who served as a member of the West Virginia House of Delegates from the 67th District. He served from 1982 through 1984, from 1992 through 2012, and from 2018 to 2022.

External links
West Virginia Legislature - Delegate John Doyle official government website

1942 births
Living people
Democratic Party members of the West Virginia House of Delegates
People from Covington, Virginia
People from Shepherdstown, West Virginia
Shepherd University alumni
21st-century American politicians